The Aftermath is an Ingush singer-songwriter duo formed in 2004 by sisters Fatima Matieva and Taita Matieva, based in Moscow, Russia. They were born and grew up in Grozny, Chechen Republic.

In 2006 the 1st album "I Follow Song" consisted of 14 songs of the sisters, was released in Russia.

In 2012 the 2nd album "Charming October" came out as an insert and with the duo's interview in the music magazine Stereo&Video. All 12 songs in the album are written and composed by the sisters. The release received many acknowledgements and reviews around Russia.

On 21 November 2018 the 3rd album "The Fugitive Kind" was released by Butman Music Records. The world-famous jazz musicians Igor Butman и Arkady Shilkloper participated in the recording of the album. All 13 songs in the album are again fully original written by Fatima and Taita.

The sisters' music is highly acclaimed by the music critic Artemy Troitsky.

Members 
 Fatima Matieva – vocals, keyboards, words and music
 Taita Matieva – vocals, guitar, words and music

Discography

Albums
 2018: The Fugitive Kind
 2012: Charming October
 2006: I Follow Song

Singles
 2011: "Santa Claus"

Video
 2018 "New Year's Eve" featuring Igor Butman
 2018 "He Said I Am" featuring Igor Butman
 2018 "Sense of life"
 2017 "Memories" featuring Arkady Shilkloper
 2016 "Tell Me What Is Your Nature"
 2013 The Aftermath performance at "EcoPath" festival, Moscow
 2012 "I haven't seen you many days" music video

Interesting facts
 Fatima and Taita do not have music education. Fatima's educational background is English language and Finance. Taita has PhD degree in Mathematics.

References 
 Interview for "Eto Kavkaz" portal
 Review of "Charming October" album by Artemy Troitsky
 Review of "Charming October" album by InRock magazine
 Interview for Stereo&Video magazine
 Interview for ArtBeat Jazz music label
 Charming October on 3Plet

External links
 Official website

All-female bands